The Perth Shiva Temple (Tamil: பெர்த் சிவன்  கோவில்), officially Perth Hindu Temple, is a Hindu temple in Canning Vale, in Perth, Australia, dedicated to the god Shiva and his consort goddess Meenakshi. The temple is run by the Shri Shiva Devasthanam, a non-profit religious organisation, and was completed in early 1990. It is the oldest Hindu temple in Western Australia.

History 
Plans for a Hindu temple in Perth were first mooted in 1985. The land was consecrated in 1987 by Shantanand Saraswati and construction was completed and the icons installed in February 1990. It is the oldest Hindu temple in Western Australia; another temple was built in Perth by Tamil Hindus. The temple's construction, including a final Royal Tower (for which Perth council contributed over $600,000) took over 20 years and was completed in June 2008.

The main deity of the temple is Shiva. The following deities also have shrines in the temple: Ganesha (Vinayagar), Meenakshi (referred to as "Devi" in the temple), Murugan, Durga, the Navagraha, Bairavar, Hanuman, Vishnu, and Lakshmi. Some of the icons are gifts of swamis Shantanand Saraswati and Haridhos Giri. The wooden icon of Hanuman was a gift soon after the temple opened, from a Chinese man who said the god had commanded him to take it to a temple.

In May 2022, in the lead up to Australia's national elections, both major parties promised donations of $1 million towards development of the temple.

Festivals and events
The temple priests perform poojas to specific gods and goddesses. In addition, festivals celebrated at the temple include the following.

Maha Shivaratri
Maha Shivaratri: the temple is open for an entire day and night of fasting and meditation in honor of the god Shiva.

Purattasi 
Purattasi, a Hindu month celebrating Perumal (an avatar of Vishnu), with prayers and a vegetarian feast each Saturday.

Pradosham
Pradosham, bimonthly prayers to Shiva during the three hours surrounding sunset on the thirteenth day of every fortnight in the Hindu calendar, with an hour-long mantra sung in the temple.

See also

 Hinduism in Australia

References

External links

 Official website: Hindu Association of Western Australia

Hindu temples in Australia
Religious buildings and structures in Perth, Western Australia
1990 establishments in Australia
Shiva temples